United Nations Security Council Resolution 2030 was unanimously adopted on 21 December 2011 after recalling resolution 1949 (2010). The Council called on the Government and political stakeholders in Guinea-Bissau to work together to consolidate peace and stability, use legal and peaceful means to resolve differences and intensify efforts for genuine and inclusive political dialogue and national reconciliation.

See also 
List of United Nations Security Council Resolutions 2001 to 2100

References

External links
Text of the Resolution at undocs.org

 2030
2011 in Guinea-Bissau
 2030
December 2011 events